Alresford Town Football Club is a football club based in New Alresford, Hampshire, England.

History
The original Alresford Town was established in 1898 and were members of the Winchester & District League. The modern club was established in 1989 and joined the North Hants League. After finishing as runners-up in their first season, they  moved up to Division Two of the Hampshire League. The club were Division Two runners-up in 1990–91, securing a second successive promotion to Division One. However, after finishing second-from-bottom of Division One in 1994–95, they were relegated back to Division Two. At the end of the following season the club left to rejoin the North Hants League.

Alresford were North Hants League champions in 1999–2000 and returned to Division Two of the Hampshire League. After finishing second in Division Two in 2001–02 they were promoted to Division One. In 2004 the Hampshire League merged into the Wessex League, with the club becoming members of the new Division Two. The division was renamed Division One in 2006 and Alresford were runners-up in 2006–07, earning promotion to the Premier Division. After five seasons in the lower-mid table, the club were Premier Division runners-up in 2012–13, a season that saw them win the Hampshire League (beating AFC Bournemouth in the final), the Wessex League Cup and the North Hants Senior Cup. They were Premier Division runners-up again the following season, also retaining the League Cup and the North Hants Senior Cup, as well as winning the Aldershot Senior Cup.

In 2018–19 Alresford won the Southampton Senior Cup, beating AFC Stoneham 3–0 in the final. The 2019–20 season was abandoned due to the coronavirus pandemic with Alresford top of the Premier Division.

Season-by-season record

Honours
Wessex League
League Cup winners 2012–13, 2013–14
North Hants League
Champions 1999–2000
Hampshire Senior Cup
 Winners 2012–13
North Hants Senior Cup
Winners 2012–13, 2013–14
Aldershot Senior Cup
Winners 2013–14
Southampton Senior Cup
Winners 2018–19

Records
Best FA Cup performance: Second qualifying round, 2016–17
Best FA Vase performance: Fourth round, 2013–14
Record attendance: 194 vs Blackfield & Langley, Wessex League Premier Division, 2 May 2013

See also
Alresford Town F.C. players

References

External links
Official website

Football clubs in England
Football clubs in Hampshire
Association football clubs established in 1898
Association football clubs established in 1987
New Alresford
1898 establishments in England
1987 establishments in England
Winchester and District Saturday Football League
North Hants League
Hampshire League
Wessex Football League